John Westbury (died c. 1443), also John de Westbury or John of Westbury, of Hill Deverill, Wiltshire, was an English politician.

He was a Member (MP) of the Parliament of England for Wiltshire in 1417 and 1419.

His elder brother was William de Westbury.

References

Year of birth missing
1443 deaths
English MPs 1417
People from Wiltshire
English MPs 1419
Members of the Parliament of England (pre-1707) for Wiltshire